USS LST-459 was a United States Navy  used in the Asiatic-Pacific Theater during World War II. As with many of her class, the ship was never named. Instead, she was referred to by her hull designation.

Construction
The ship was laid down on 22 September 1942, under Maritime Commission (MARCOM) contract, MC hull 979, by Kaiser Shipyards, Vancouver, Washington; launched 29 October 1942; and commissioned on 13 February 1943,.

Service history
During World War II, LST-459 was assigned to the Asiatic-Pacific theater. She took part in the Bismarck Archipelago operation, the Cape Gloucester, New Britain, landings December through February 1944, and the Admiralty Islands landings in March 1944; the Hollandia operation in April 1944; the Western New Guinea operations, the Biak Islands operation in May and June 1944, the Noemfoor Island operation in July 1944, the Cape Sansapor operation in August 1944, and the Morotai landing in September 1944; the Leyte operation in November 1944; the Lingayen Gulf landings in January 1945; and the consolidation and capture of the southern Philippines during the Mindanao landings in March 1945, and the Sulu Archipelago landings in April 1945.

Post-war service
Following the war, LST-459 performed occupation duty in the Far East until mid-November 1945. Upon her return to the United States, she was decommissioned on 12 April 1946, and struck from the Navy list on 19 June, that same year. On 31 October 1947, the ship was sold to the New Orleans Shipwrecking Co., New Orleans, Louisiana, and subsequently scrapped.

Honors and awards
LST-459 earned six battle stars for her World War II service.

Notes 

Citations

Bibliography 

Online resources

External links

USS LST-459 at www.uboat.net

 

1942 ships
World War II amphibious warfare vessels of the United States
LST-1-class tank landing ships of the United States Navy
S3-M2-K2 ships
Ships built in Vancouver, Washington